The 2014 International Crown was a women's golf team event organized by the LPGA, played July 24–27 at the Caves Valley Golf Club in Owings Mills, Maryland, a suburb northwest of Baltimore. This was the inaugural International Crown, a biennial match play event contested between teams of four players representing eight countries. The field in 2014 consisted of 31 professionals and one amateur, and the winning team, Spain, earned $400,000, or $100,000 per player.

Format
The first three days, Thursday through Saturday, featured round-robin pool play matches at fourball. Each match was worth two points for a win and one point for a halve. Following the completion of pool play, the top two teams in each pool and one wild card team (determined by a playoff of the third place teams) advanced to singles play. The five remaining teams were re-seeded based on points earned in pool play, and each team played one singles match against each of the other teams on Sunday. The total points earned in pool and singles play determined the team champion.

Course

Source:

Teams
On November 13, 2013, eight teams qualified to participate in this event, based on the combined world rankings of the top four players from each country: Australia, Chinese Taipei, Japan, South Korea, Spain, Sweden, Thailand, and the United States. The team members were finalized on March 31, 2014, and divided into two pools. Due to a world rankings error, the teams from Australia and Chinese Taipei switched seeds and pools.

Initial

Revised

Late changes: for Japan, Rikako Morita declined to play; Shiho Oyama (ranked 47), the first alternate, also declined to play; Mamiko Higa (ranked 50) finalized the Japanese team.

Results

Day one pool play
Thursday, July 24, 2014

Pool A
United States vs. Chinese Taipei
Match 7: Kung/Lu (TPE) defeated Creamer/Kerr (USA), 4 & 3
Match 8: Tseng/Yao (TPE) defeated Lewis/Thompson (USA), 1 up
Thailand vs. Spain
Match 1: Ciganda/Muñoz (ESP) defeated Phatlum/Sattayabanphot (THA), 3 & 2
Match 2: A. Jutanugarn/M. Jutanugarn (THA) and Mozo/Recari (ESP), halved

Standings

Pool B
South Korea vs. Australia
Match 5: Park/Ryu (KOR) defeated Kirk/Wright (AUS), 3 & 2
Match 6: Lee/Webb (AUS) defeated Choi/Kim (KOR), 2 up
Japan vs. Sweden
Match 3: Higa/M. Miyazato (JPN) and Hedwall/Nordqvist (SWE), halved
Match 4: Yokomine/A. Miyazato (JPN) defeated Lindberg/Parmlid (SWE), 2 up

Standings

Source:

Day two pool play
Friday, July 25, 2014
Pool A
United States vs. Spain
Match 15: Kerr/Thompson (USA) defeated Mozo/Recari (ESP), 3 & 2
Match 16: Creamer/Lewis (USA) defeated Ciganda/Muñoz (ESP), 2 up
Thailand vs. Chinese Taipei
Match 9: A. Jutanugarn/M. Jutanugarn (THA) defeated Kung/Lu (TPE), 3 & 2
Match 10: Phatlum/Sattayabanphot (THA) defeated Tseng/Yao (TPE), 1 up

Standings

Pool B 	  	  	  	  	  	  	  	 
South Korea vs. Sweden
Match 13:  Hedwall/Nordqvist (SWE) defeated Park/Ryu (KOR), 1 up
Match 14:  Choi/Kim (KOR) defeated Lindberg/Parmlid (SWE), 1 up
Japan vs. Australia
Match 11: Higa/M. Miyazato (JPN) defeated Lee/Webb (AUS), 3 & 2
Match 12: A. Miyazato/Yokomine (JPN) and Kirk/Wright (AUS), halved

Standings

Source:

Day three pool play
Saturday, July 26, 2014
Pool A
United States vs. Thailand
Match 23: Kerr/Thompson (USA) defeated A. Jutanugarn/M. Jutanugarn (THA), 3 & 2
Match 24: Phatlum/Sattayabanphot (THA) defeated Creamer/Lewis (USA), 1 up
Spain vs. Chinese Taipei
Match 19: Ciganda/Muñoz (ESP) defeated Tseng/Yao (TPE), 6 & 5
Match 20: Mozo/Recari (ESP) defeated Kung/Lu (TPE), 2 up

Standings

Pool B
South Korea vs. Japan
Match 21: Park/Ryu (KOR) defeated Higa/M. Miyazato (JPN), 4 & 3
Match 22: A. Miyazato/Yokomine (JPN) defeated Choi/Kim (KOR), 3 & 2
Sweden vs. Australia
Match 17: Hedwall/Nordqvist (SWE) defeated vs. Lee/Webb (AUS), 4 & 3
Match 18: Lindberg/Parmlid (SWE) defeated Kirk/Wright (AUS), 7 & 5
 
Standings

Wild card
Spain and Thailand advanced to singles played from pool A and Japan and Sweden advanced from pool B. The United States and South Korea each finished third in pool play and engaged in a sudden-death playoff for the wild card spot in singles play. Park and Ryu (KOR) eliminated Kerr and Thompson (USA) on the first playoff hole and South Korea advanced to singles play.

Standings

Singles play
Sunday, July 27, 2014

Spain swept its four singles matches and secured the title after the third win. Sweden and South Korea both won two matches while Japan and Thailand had one victory each.

Match 25: Park (KOR) defeated Hedwall (SWE), 4 & 2
Match 26: Phatlum (THA) defeated Kim (KOR), 1 up
Match 27: Lindberg (SWE) defeated A. Jutanugarn (THA), 6 & 5
Match 28: Ciganda (ESP) defeated Choi (KOR), 8 & 6
Match 29: Ryu (KOR) defeated Yokomine (JPN), 1 up
Match 30: Recari (ESP) defeated Parmlid (SWE), 3 & 2
Match 31: Nordqvist (SWE) defeated Higa (JPN), 3 & 2
Match 32: Mozo (ESP) defeated M. Jutanugarn (THA), 3 & 2
Match 33: M. Miyazato (JPN) defeated Sattayabanphot (THA), 3 & 1
Match 34: Muñoz (ESP) defeated A. Miyazato (JPN), 2 & 1

Source:

Final standings

References

External links

Coverage on the official LPGA website
Coverage on ESPN
Local coverage from The Baltimore Sun

International Crown
Golf in Maryland
Sports in Baltimore County, Maryland
International Crown
International Crown
International Crown